The 2017 Supercupa României was the 19th edition of Romania's season opener cup competition. The game was contested between Liga I title holders, Viitorul Constanța, and Romanian Cup holders, Voluntari. It was played at Municipal Stadium in Botoșani in July. Voluntari won the trophy for the first time in its history, after defeating Viitorul Constanța with 1–0.

Match

Details

References

External links
Romania - List of Super Cup Finals, RSSSF.com

2017–18 in Romanian football
Supercupa României
FC Viitorul Constanța matches
FC Voluntari matches
Botoșani
July 2017 sports events in Europe